Silvia Kolbowski is an Argentine-born American artist whose work focuses on cultural and political issues. Kolbowski works primarily with video and installation formats, as well as photography, often using historical figures and events to analyze cultural phenomena and power imbalances.

The video project "an inadequate history of conceptual art," (2000) records the videotaped responses of 22 artists, asked by Kolbowski to describe a work of conceptual or performance art that they had witnessed in the 1960s and ‘70s. The identities of artists speaking not not revealed and the speakers were instructed not to name the artist or the title of the work they described. Kolbowski maintains anonymity visually by filming only the hands of the respondents as they speak. Kolbowski is neither seen, nor does she interact with the speakers.

Kolbowski identifies her work as a “history” of conceptual art, and the ensuing testimonies, at first, appear to constitute an archive of documentary evidence supporting that claim to historicity. By qualifying that history as inadequate, Kolbowski foregrounds the fallacies inherent in all claims to historicity, and in the work no history is articulated.

An Inadequate History of Conceptual Art is an open-ended meditation on an episode in the history of art she admires. It is also a work of conceptual art in its own right, shaped by an artist who is conspicuous in her absence.

Her video projects on Ulrike Meinhof and Rosa Luxemburg reanimate historical figures who speak to contemporary issues of violence and political resistance. Her works are also informed by aspects of feminist and psychoanalytic theory. For example, in an early series, Model Pleasure (1982), Kolbowski appropriates images of women from mass-media sources to create grids of images that make allusions to the ways that women are defined by media.

Her work has been exhibited in The Tapei Biennial, the Villa Arson (Nice), the Whitney Biennial, and the Hammer Museum, and others. She has had solo exhibitions at the Museum of Modern Art (Ljubljana), the Center for Contemporary Art (Warsaw), The Secession (Vienna), LAX<>ART (Los Angeles), and the Bina Ellen Gallery (Montreal).

Silvia Kolbowski was born in 1953 in Buenos Aires, Argentina. She earned an associate degree from Franconia College, New Hampshire in 1974. Kolbowski earned her B.S. from Hunter College, graduating magna cum laude in 1980. She was a fellow at The Institute for Architecture and Urban Studies from 1980 until 1983.

Kolbowski is on the advisory board of October journal, where she was a co-editor between 1993 and 2000. She has taught at the Whitney Independent Research Program, the CCC program of the Ecole Superiéure d'Art Visuel, Geneva, the Architecture Department of Parsons The New School for Design, NY, and the School of Art at The Cooper Union. In 2019 her archive was acquired by the Bard College, Center for Curatorial Studies Archive.

References

1953 births
Living people
Academic journal editors
American artists
Argentine emigrants to the United States
Franconia College alumni
Hunter College alumni
People from Buenos Aires
20th-century American women artists
21st-century American women